Baekunsan (lit. White Cloud Mountain) is a mountain located in Duseomyeon, Ulju County, Ulsan, South Korea. It was previously named Albaksan during the Silla Dynsasy.

See also
Geography of Korea
List of South Korean tourist attractions
List of mountains in Korea
Mountain portal
South Korea portal

References

Mountains of Ulsan
Mountains of South Gyeongsang Province
Ulju County
Mountains of South Korea